Haplochrois otiosa is a moth in the family Elachistidae. It is found in Mexico.

References

Natural History Museum Lepidoptera generic names catalog

Elachistidae
Moths of Central America